Jess Sims née Jessica Williams (born 1990) is a Welsh international lawn and indoor bowler. Jess has represented Wales for many years in Junior and Senior squads. In 2015 she won the fours silver medal at the Atlantic Bowls Championships.

In 2016, she won the gold medal with Laura Thomas in the pairs at the 2016 World Outdoor Bowls Championship in Christchurch.

She was selected as part of the Welsh team for the 2018 Commonwealth Games on the Gold Coast in Queensland

References

Welsh female bowls players
1990 births
Living people
Bowls World Champions
Bowls players at the 2018 Commonwealth Games
Commonwealth Games competitors for Wales